Ernst Würthwein (born 1909 in Tübingen; died 1996) was a German Protestant Theologian.

He was a professor of Old Testament at the University of Marburg. He worked mainly on questions of textual history of the Old Testament. He is the author and co-author of numerous books.

References 

Old Testament scholars
Academic staff of the University of Marburg
20th-century German theologians
1909 births
1996 deaths